Asura hemixantha is a moth of the  family Erebidae. It is found on Indonesia (Tenimber).

References

hemixantha
Moths described in 1900
Moths of Indonesia